Events from the year 1509 in India.

Events
 3 February – Battle of Diu is fought.
 26 July – Krishnadevaraya starts his reign as Emperor of the Vijayanagara Empire 
 Francisco de Almeida ceases his governorship of Portuguese India (commenced 1505)
 Afonso de Albuquerque becomes governor of Portuguese India (and continues until 1515)
The Portuguese acquire Bombay.

Births
 Kanaka Dasaru poet, philosopher, musician and composer is born in modern Karnataka (dies 1609)

Deaths
 Viranarasimha Raya king of Vijayanagar empire

See also
 Timeline of Indian history

References

 
India